Euphlyctis ehrenbergii (Arabian five-fingered frog or Arabian skittering frog) is a species of frog in the family Dicroglossidae. It is endemic to the  southwestern Arabian Peninsula in Saudi Arabia and Yemen. It has been treated as a subspecies of Euphlyctis cyanophlyctis, but is now considered as a valid species. The specific name ehrenbergii honours Christian Gottfried Ehrenberg (1795–1876), a German natural scientist.

E. ehrenbergii is restricted to areas of permanent and temporary water in the Red Sea coast of Yemen and Saudi Arabia. A very aquatic species, it can also be present in irrigated areas.

References

ehrenbergii
Vertebrates of the Arabian Peninsula
Amphibians described in 1863
Taxa named by Wilhelm Peters
Taxonomy articles created by Polbot